The 2015–16 Israeli Premier League was the seventeenth season since its introduction in 1999 and the 74th season of top-tier football in Israel. It  began on 22 August 2015 and ended in May 2016. Hapoel Be'er Sheva became champion after 40 years without winning a main national competition, interrupting the sequence of three consecutive titles of Maccabi Tel Aviv.

Teams
A total of fourteen teams were competing in the league, including twelve sides from the 2014–15 season and two promoted teams from the 2014–15 Liga Leumit.

Hapoel Petah Tikva and F.C. Ashdod were relegated to the 2015–16 Liga Leumit after finishing the 2014–15 Israeli Premier League in the bottom two places.

Bnei Yehuda Tel Aviv and Hapoel Kfar Saba  were promoted after finishing the 2014–15 Liga Leumit in the top two places.

Stadia and locations

Personnel and sponsorship

Foreign players
The number of foreign players is restricted to five per team.

In bold: Players that have been capped for their national team.

Managerial changes

Regular season

Regular season table

Regular season results

Play-offs

Championship round 

Key numbers for pairing determination (number marks position after 26 games):

Championship round table

Championship round results

Relegation round 
Key numbers for pairing determination (number marks position after 26 games):

Relegation round table

Relegation round results

Positions by round
The table lists the positions of teams after each week of matches. Note that Championship round teams will play in 36 matchdays, and the Relegation round teams will compete in only 33 matches.

Source: Israel Football Association

Season statistics

Top scorers

Source: Israel Football Association

Attendances

References

External links
 uefa.com

Israeli Premier League seasons
1
Israel